Lakeland High School (LHS), located in Shrub Oak, New York, United States, is a senior public high school serving students in ninth through twelfth grades as part of the Lakeland Central School District. Along with its sister school, Walter Panas High School of Cortlandt Manor, LHS attracts a culturally diverse (70% white
The school's colors are gold and green, and its mascot is a hornet.

As of the 2014–15 school year, the school had an enrollment of 1,045 students and 77.3 classroom teachers (on an FTE basis), for a student–teacher ratio of 13.5:1. There were 133 students (12.7% of enrollment) eligible for free lunch and 42 (4.0% of students) eligible for reduced-cost lunch.

Performance
The Class of 2016 had an unweighted average GPA of 86.31, with a range of 98.35-71.03.

In 2015, a total of 348 students took 715 AP exams, with 60% scoring a 3 (out of 5) or better. There were over 60 AP Scholars.

Notable alumni

 T.C. Boyle, author, taught at Lakeland High School from 1968 to 1972
 Jonathan de Marte (born 1993), Israeli-American baseball pitcher 
 Melissa González, member of the USA Women's Olympic Field Hockey Team
 Lawrence Lindsay (1972), economist, former member of the Board of Governors of the Federal Reserve, professor at Harvard University
 Jessica Lynn (2008), country music artist
 Herb Trimpe (1957), illustrator responsible for designing the school's mascot
Chris Pangalos (1981), All-American soccer player, member of Lakeland High School Athletic Hall of Fame and Keene State College Athletic Hall of Fame.

References

External links
 Lakeland High School website

1972 establishments in New York (state)
Educational institutions established in 1972
Public high schools in Westchester County, New York